Sean Conway,  (born July 24, 1951) is a former provincial politician in Ontario, Canada and a university professor. He served for 28 years as a Liberal member of the Legislative Assembly of Ontario from 1975 to 2003, and was a high-profile cabinet minister in the government of David Peterson.

After positions as a Fellow in the School of Policy Studies at Queen's University in Kingston, Ontario, a special assistant to the Principal of Queen's University, Daniel Woolf, and the Acting Vice-Principal (Advancement) at Queen's, Conway is currently an instructor at St. Michael's College at the University of Toronto and a Distinguished Research Fellow in the Centre for Urban Energy at Ryerson University.

Background

Conway attended St Joseph's Separate School and Madawaska Valley District High School. He earned his Bachelor of Arts at Waterloo Lutheran University (now Wilfrid Laurier University), and his Masters at Queen's University, both in history. His grandfather, Thomas Patrick Murray, represented Renfrew South for the Liberals from 1929 to 1945.

Politics
In the provincial election of 1975, at age twenty-four, Conway was elected as a Liberal Member of Provincial Parliament (MPP) for the eastern Ontario riding of Renfrew North. He defeated Progressive Conservative candidate Bob Cotnam by 183 votes. The Progressive Conservatives won a minority government in the election, and Conway sat with his party in the opposition benches.

The Liberals increased their parliamentary representation in the 1977 election, although not by enough to form government; Conway was re-elected over Cotnam by an increased margin. He became his party's official Critic for Health following the election, and served in this capacity for the entirety of the four-year minority parliament which followed.

The Progressive Conservatives won a majority government in the 1981 provincial election, although Conway was popular enough in his own riding to be re-elected by about 2,000 votes. On March 9, 1982, he was chosen as Deputy Leader of the Ontario Liberal Party by David Peterson, who had defeated Sheila Copps in a leadership convention the previous month.

In government
The provincial election of 1985 resulted in a minority parliament, with the Progressive Conservatives having only four more seats than the Liberals and the New Democratic Party holding the balance of power with twenty-five seats. Conway, by this time regarded as being on the progressive wing of his party, was involved in the Liberal Party's post-election negotiations with the NDP. In this capacity, he helped bring about a written pact, in which the NDP offered support to the Liberals for two years in return for certain progressive legislative initiatives. On June 26, 1985 he was named as the province's Minister of Education.

Conway's most controversial responsibility as Education Minister was managing the government's legislation for full funding to Ontario's Roman Catholic separate schools. Conway's grandfather, Thomas Murray, had championed a similar initiative in the 1930s, and was disappointed when Mitchell Hepburn backed away from a previous commitment in the face of Protestant opposition. Conway had supported the announcement of full funding by Bill Davis's Progressive Conservative government prior to the 1985 election, and was responsible for significantly increasing the actual revenues to the Catholic system after a mathematical error in the Davis government's funding formula came to light. He also guaranteed hiring rights for non-Catholics within the system, and exempted non-Catholic children from compulsory religious education in separate high schools.

For Conway, the issue of separate-school funding was a question of righting an historical wrong; others, however, regarded government funding of Catholic education as a threat to the public school system. The larger issue of denominational school funding remains extremely controversial in the province.

On June 17, 1986, Conway was also named Acting Ontario Minister of Government Services, a position which he held until the dissolution of parliament in 1987. He was re-elected by a landslide in the 1987 provincial election, in which the Liberals won 95 of 130 seats. On September 29, 1987, he was named Government Government House Leader and Minister of Mines. Following a cabinet shuffle on August 2, 1989, he was again named Minister of Education, and also held the portfolios of Minister of Skills Development and Minister of Colleges and Universities.

Cabinet positions

In opposition
Like many others in the Peterson government, Conway opposed holding an early election in 1990 (in fact, he would later reveal that sentiment in the party caucus was almost uniformly against an early trip to the polls). Nonetheless, Peterson called a snap provincial election in 1990, and his party was resoundingly defeated by the NDP. Conway himself was re-elected in a landslide in Renfrew North, where the NDP has a very limited base of historical support.
 On September 17, 1991, he was chosen as Deputy Leader of the Official Opposition. Conway did not contest the Liberal leadership in 1992.

The Progressive Conservatives under Mike Harris returned to government in the 1995 provincial election with a large majority. Despite the Tories' sweep of much of the province, Conway's personal popularity allowed him a fairly easily re-election in Renfrew North.

Conway supported Dwight Duncan's bid to succeed Lyn McLeod as party leader in 1996; Duncan finished fourth against Dalton McGuinty. Conway continued to serve as Deputy Opposition Leader until December 19, 1996, when he was replaced him with Joseph Cordiano. In the 1999 election, he defeated an incumbent MPP, Tory Leo Jordan, in the redistributed riding of Renfrew--Nipissing--Pembroke. With the retirement of Bud Wildman in 1999, Conway became the longest-serving member of the legislature.

Having spent more than half his life as an MPP, Conway decided to retire before the 2003 provincial election.

After politics
He is currently a member of TV Ontario's political discussion panel, a public policy advisor with Gowling Lafleur Henderson LLP, an instructor at St. Michael's College at the University of Toronto and a Distinguished Research Fellow in the Centre for Urban Energy at Ryerson University.

On November 20, 2008, Conway was appointed as Acting Vice-Principal (Advancement) at Queen's.

In November 2007, Conway was honoured with the prestigious Churchill Society Award for Excellence in the Cause of Parliamentary Democracy. Previous recipients include former Prime Ministers, Cabinet Ministers, Premiers and Lieutenant Governors.

Conway offered significant assistance to former Canadian Prime Minister Paul Martin, in the project to publish Martin's memoirs, Hell Or High Water: My Life In And Out of Politics, which appeared in late 2008. Conway performed many interviews for the National Archives of Canada, which were also utilized for the book.

Conway endorsed Sandra Pupatello in the 2013 Ontario Liberal Party leadership election.

References

Notes

Citations

External links
 

1951 births
Living people
Ontario Liberal Party MPPs
Queen's University at Kingston alumni
Academic staff of the Queen's University at Kingston
Wilfrid Laurier University alumni
People from Pembroke, Ontario
Members of the Executive Council of Ontario
21st-century Canadian politicians